Serbian postal codes consist of five digits. The first two digits roughly correspond to the corresponding district; district seat cities usually have 000 as the last three digits, while smaller towns and villages have non-round last three digits.

A six-digit postcode format has been in place since 1 January 2005.

References

External links
 JP "Pošta Srbije" – poštanska mreža

See also
 Postal codes in Kosovo
 List of postal codes in Montenegro

Serbia
Communications in Serbia
Serbia
Postal codes
Postal codes